Game drive or sometimes also written gamedrive is a word which is based on two words, namely game and drive. The word game refers to animals that are not domesticated, the so-called wildlife. The word drive refers to a drive with a vehicle.

A game drive is usually part of a safari, a trip or a journey. It can be carried out with own cars like in national parks or game reserves, or it can be a guided tour in specially for that purpose adapted off-road vehicles led by a professional safari guide. Those 4 × 4 game viewing vehicles are designed to allow a safer trip for tourists. On farms and lodges however, a game drive is an adventure that entails viewing wildlife in an off-road car, always accompanied by safari guides or the farmer himself, who will explain the animal's behavior and interpret the bush.

Guided game drives mostly take place in the early morning, late afternoon or in the evening, because most animals are more active during cooler times of the day.

References

External links 

Adventure travel
Tourist activities